Verticordia blepharophylla is a flowering plant in the myrtle family, Myrtaceae and is endemic to the south-west of Western Australia. It is an erect, open shrub with a single main stem, leaves with hairy margins and pale to deep mauve-pink flowers and which occurs in an area between Perth and Geraldton.

Description

Flowering time is from late November to February.

Taxonomy and naming
Verticordia blepharophylla was first formally described by Alex George in 1991 and the description was published in Nuytsia from specimens collected near Mount Adams by Margaret Pieroni. According to George, the specific epithet (blepharophylla) is derived from the ancient Greek words blepharis meaning "eyelash" and phyllon meaning "leaf", referring to the hairy leaf margins.

George placed this species in subgenus Eperephes, section Verticordella along with V. pennigera, V. halophila, V. bifimbriata, V. lindleyi, V. carinata, V. drummondii, V. wonganensis,V. paludosa, V. luteola, V. attenuata, V. tumida, V. mitodes, V. centipeda, V. auriculata, V. pholidophylla, V. spicata and V. hughanii.

Distribution and habitat
This verticordia grows in deep sand or in low-lying sandy-clay, often with other verticordia species in heath and shrubland. It is found in areas between Mount Adams and Hill River in the Geraldton Sandplains and Swan Coastal Plain biogeographic regions.

Conservation
Verticordia blepharophylla is classified as "not threatened" by the Western Australian Government Department of Parks and Wildlife.

Use in horticulture
This verticordia species has proven to be adaptable to garden conditions, producing large bunches of perfumed flowers, sometimes throughout the year in a wide range of growing conditions and soil types. It can be propagated relatively easily from seed or from cuttings and plants have often flowered in their first year.

References

blepharophylla
Rosids of Western Australia
Eudicots of Western Australia
Plants described in 1991